Actornithophilus is a genus of louse in the family Amblycera. It was circumscribed by Gordon Floyd Ferris in 1916. Its species are ectoparasites of birds in the order Charadriiformes.

Species
, the following species are recognized:

 A. ardeolae 
 A. bicolor 
 A. canuti 
 A. ceruleus 
 A. crinitus 
 A. erinaceus 
 A. flumineus 
 A. gracilis 
 A. grandiceps 
 A. himantopi 
 A. hoplopteri 
 A. incisus 
 A. kilauensis 
 A. lacustris 
 A. limarius 
 A. limosae 
 A. lyallpurensis 
 A. mexicanus 
 A. multisetosus 
 A. nodularis 
 A. ocellatus 
 A. ochraceus  
 A. paludosus  
 A. patellatus 
 A. pauliani 
 A. pediculoides 
 A. piceus 
 A. pustulosus 
 A. sabulosus 
 A. sedes 
 A. spinulosus 
 A. stictus 
 A. tetralicis 
 A. totani 
 A. umbrinus 
 A. uniseriatus

References

External links
Signs of Head Lice in Coily Black Hair

Lice
Ectoparasites
Parasites of birds